Albert Michant was a Belgian water polo player and  won  Silver medals at the 1900 Summer Olympics and  the 1908 Summer Olympics.

See also
 Belgium men's Olympic water polo team records and statistics
 List of Olympic medalists in water polo (men)
 List of men's Olympic water polo tournament goalkeepers

References

External links
 

Belgian male water polo players
Water polo goalkeepers
Olympic swimmers of Belgium
Olympic water polo players of Belgium
Olympic silver medalists for Belgium
Water polo players at the 1900 Summer Olympics
Water polo players at the 1908 Summer Olympics
Olympic medalists in water polo
Year of birth missing
Year of death missing
Place of birth missing
Medalists at the 1900 Summer Olympics
20th-century Belgian people
Place of death missing